Danila Nikolaievich Zhuravlyov (born 8 April 2000) is a Russian professional ice hockey defenseman currently playing under contract with Ak Bars Kazan of the National Hockey League (KHL). He was selected in the fifth round, 146th overall, by the Colorado Avalanche in the 2018 NHL Entry Draft.

Playing career
Zhuravlyov played with the Torpedo Nizhny Novgorod hockey school as a teen, before moving to continue his development within Ak Bars Kazan. He made his debut in the MHL with JHC Irbis during the 2016–17 season, scoring 2 goals and 8 points in 35 games as a 16-year-old. Showing a defensive acumen and sound two-way game, Zhuravlyov was promoted to Ak Bars' second tier club, Bars Kazan, the following season registering 2 points in 11 games. He played the majority of the 2017–18 season in the MHL, producing 9 goals and 18 points through 28 games.

Ranked 50th amongst international skaters by the NHL Central Scouting Bureau, Zhuravlyov was selected in his first year of eligibility in the fifth round, 146th overall, by the Colorado Avalanche in the 2018 NHL Entry Draft. He continued his development with Bars Kazan in the VHL in the 2018–19 season, finishing his first full professional season by making 40 appearances with 5 assists as an 18-year-old.

Contracted with Ak Bars through 2021, Zhuravlyov impressed head coach Dmitri Kvartalnov through training camp and was elevated to remain with the senior squad to open the 2019–20 season. As a 19-year-old he made his KHL debut on opening night in a 3–2 defeat to reigning champions CSKA Moscow on 3 September 2019. In his third game, Zhuravlyov impressed in registering his first point, an assist, in a 6–3 victory over HC Sochi on 7 September 2019. In collecting three assists through his first 10 games while playing significant minutes in a second pairing role due to injuries among the blueline, Zhuravlyov was honored as the KHL's rookie of the month for September.

On 2 May 2022, Zhuravlyov signed a two-year, entry-level deal with the Colorado Avalanche. After attending his first training camp with the Avalanche, Zhuarvlyov was assigned to American Hockey League (AHL) affiliate, the Colorado Eagles, to begin the 2022–23 season. Zhuravlyov posted 1 assists through 14 games on the blueline for the Eagles before reports surfaced of his intention to return to his native Russia due to personal reasons and rejoin former club, Ak Bars. On 21 November 2022, Zhuravlyov was officially suspended by the Avalanche on his return to Russia, with the club initially retaining his rights. With no clause in his contract pertaining to a release to the KHL, Zhuravlyov was later placed on unconditional waivers by the Avalanche in order for a mutual termination of the remainder of his contract on 19 December 2022. 

As a free agent, Zhuravlyov officially returned to Ak Bars Kazan for the remainder of the 2022–23 season on 20 December 2022.

International play

 

 
 

Zhuravlyov first represented Russia at the junior level at the 2016 Winter Youth Olympics. He later made his North American debut at the 2016 World U-17 Hockey Challenge, featuring in 6 games in a bronze medal effort. He went on to appear with Russia at the 2017 Ivan Hlinka Memorial Tournament, 2018 World Junior A Challenge and the 2018 IIHF World U18 Championships.

Kovalenko returned to the national stage after he was selected to the Russian team for the 2019 World Junior Championships in Vancouver, Canada. He ended the tournament with 1 assist in 7 games, helping Russia claim the Bronze medal against Switzerland on January 6, 2019.

Career statistics

Regular season and playoffs

International

Awards and honours

References

External links

2000 births
Living people
Ak Bars Kazan players
Bars Kazan players
Colorado Avalanche draft picks
Colorado Eagles players
JHC Bars players
Sportspeople from Nizhny Novgorod